The Santa Remedios Church is a religious building belonging to the Catholic Church and is located in the island of Saipan in the Northern Mariana Islands, a dependent territory of the United States in the Pacific Ocean and part of Oceania.

History
The church was inaugurated and dedicated to the Virgen de los Remedios (Our Lady of Remedies or locally: Nuestra Senora Bithen de los Remedios) officially in October 1958, following the Roman or Latin rite and depends on the Diocese of Chalan Kanoa (Dioecesis Vialembensis) which was created in 1984 by Pope John Paul II by Properamus bull. Its entrance is adorned with palm trees and gardens. The building was renovated in 1995 and rededicated on the feast of "Santa Remedios".

See also
Roman Catholic Diocese of Chalan Kanoa
Virgin of Los Remedios

References

Roman Catholic churches in the Northern Mariana Islands
Buildings and structures in Saipan
Roman Catholic churches completed in 1958
20th-century Roman Catholic church buildings